Dolgaya Luzha is a rural locality (a settlement) in Vladimir, Vladimir Oblast, Russia. The population was 18 as of 2010. There are 3 streets.

Geography 
Dolgaya Luzha is located 13 km northeast of Vladimir. Ladoga is the nearest rural locality.

References 

Rural localities in Vladimir Urban Okrug